Kosmos 2464 ( meaning Cosmos 2464) is one of a set of three Russian military satellites launched in 2010 as part of the GLONASS satellite navigation system. It was launched with Kosmos 2465 and Kosmos 2466.

This satellite is a GLONASS-M satellite, also known as Uragan-M, and is numbered Uragan-M No. 736.

Kosmos 2464/5/6 were launched from Site 81/24 at Baikonur Cosmodrome in Kazakhstan. A Proton-M carrier rocket with a Blok DM upper stage was used to perform the launch which took place at 05:49 UTC on 2 September 2010. The launch successfully placed the satellites into Medium Earth orbit. It subsequently received its Kosmos designation, and the international designator 2010-041C. The United States Space Command assigned it the Satellite Catalog Number 27139.

It is in the second orbital plane of the GLONASS constellation, in orbital slot 9. It started operations on 4 October 2010.

See also

List of Kosmos satellites (2251–2500)
List of Proton launches (2010–2019)

References

Spacecraft launched in 2010
Spacecraft launched by Proton rockets
Kosmos satellites